The first season of Friends, an American sitcom created by David Crane and Marta Kauffman, premiered on NBC on September 22, 1994. Friends was produced by Bright/Kauffman/Crane Productions, in association with Warner Bros. Television. The season contains 24 episodes and concluded airing on May 18, 1995.

Reception
Early reviews of the series were generally positive.  In the Los Angeles Daily News, Ray Richmond named the series as "one of the brighter comedies of the new season", and the Los Angeles Times called it "flat-out the best comedy series of the new season". Tom Feran of The Plain Dealer wrote that the series traded "vaguely and less successfully on the hanging-out style of Seinfeld", while Ann Hodges of the Houston Chronicle called it "the new Seinfeld wannabe, but it will never be as funny as Seinfeld." Chicago Sun-Times Ginny Holbert found Joey and Rachel's characteristics to be underdeveloped, while Richmond commended the cast as a "likeable, youth ensemble" with "good chemistry"; Robert Bianco of USA Today was complimentary of Schwimmer, calling him "terrific". He also praised the female leads, but was concerned that Perry's role as Chandler was "undefined" and that LeBlanc was "relying too much on the same brain-dead stud routine that was already tired the last two times he tried it". The authors of Friends Like Us: The Unofficial Guide to Friends thought that the cast was "trying just a little too hard", in particular Perry and Schwimmer. People Magazine said that the "saving grace" is that the characters become more likable as time goes on.

Legacy
Collider ranked the season #9 on their ranking of the ten Friends seasons. They wrote that the best episode of the season which is called "The One Where Rachel Finds Out".

Cast and characters

(In particular, Introduced in season 1 or Only in season 1)

Main cast
 Jennifer Aniston as Rachel Green
 Courteney Cox as Monica Geller
 Lisa Kudrow as Phoebe Buffay
 Matt LeBlanc as Joey Tribbiani
 Matthew Perry as Chandler Bing
 David Schwimmer as Ross Geller

Recurring cast
 Anita Barone/Jane Sibbett as Carol Willick
 Mitchell Whitfield as Barry Farber
 Cosimo Fusco as Paolo
 Maggie Wheeler as Janice Hosenstein
 Jessica Hecht as Susan Bunch
 Vincent Ventresca as Fun Bobby 
 Elliott Gould as Jack Geller
 Christina Pickles as Judy Geller
 Larry Hankin as Mr. Heckles

Guest stars
 Merrill Markoe as Marsha, Ross' boss
 Jill Goodacre as herself
 Hank Azaria as David
 Morgan Fairchild as Nora Bing
 Fisher Stevens as Roger
 Jon Lovitz as Steve
 Helen Hunt as Jamie Buchman
 Leila Kenzle as Fran Devanow
 George Clooney as Dr. Mitchell
 Noah Wyle as Dr. Rosen
 Jennifer Grey as Mindy
 Claudia Shear as Fake Monica
 Leah Remini as Lydia
 Jonathan Silverman as Dr. Franzblau
 Corinne Bohrer as Melanie
 Lauren Tom as Julie
 Sofia Milos as Aurora
 Jennifer Grant as Nina
 John Allen Nelson as Paul the Wine Guy
 Geoffrey Lower as Alan
 Beth Grant as Lizzy  
 Marianne Hagan as Joanne
 Camille Saviola as The Horrible Woman
 June Gable as The nurse
 Lee Garlington as Ronni
 Brenda Vaccaro as Gloria Tribbiani
 Robert Costanzo as Joey Tribbiani Sr.

Episodes

Notes

References

Sources

External links
 

01
1994 American television seasons
1995 American television seasons